Svetinje is a small village in the Municipality of Ormož in northeastern Slovenia. It lies on a small rise in the Slovene Hills east of the Ormož–Hodoš Railway and the village of Ivanjkovci, northeast of the village of Mihalovci. The village, established in 2005 by ceding from Mihalovci, is part of the traditional region of Styria and is included in the Drava Statistical Region.

Church
A simple Baroque church, dedicated to All Saints, stands in the center of Svetinje. It is the parish church of the Parish of Svetinje, part of the Archdiocese of Maribor. It was completed in 1730.

References

External links
Svetinje on Geopedia

Populated places in the Municipality of Ormož
Populated places established in 2005
2005 establishments in Slovenia